Xiangyang District is an administrative subdivision of the city of Jiamusi, Heilongjiang province, China, with .

Administrative divisions 
Xiangyang District is divided into 6 subdistricts. 
6 subdistricts
 Xilin, Baowei, Qiaonan, Xinangang, Jianshe, Chang'an

Notes and references

See also

External links
  Government site - 

Xiangyang, Jiamusi